Thariyode  (Malayalam: തരിയോട്, also spelled Thariode) is a village in Wayanad district in the state of Kerala, India.

Important Landmarks
 Banasura Sagar Dam – The Largest Earth Dam in India.
 Karalad Lake
 GLPS Thariode
 GHSS Thariode
 Nirmala HS Thariode
 GUPS Thariode
 Sree Paradhevatha Temple
 Lourdes Matha Church
 Kavummannam Juma Masjidh
 Louis Mount Psychiatric Hospital
 ST.JOHNS BELIEVERS EASTERN CHURCH CHENNALODE
Mariyamman Temple 10th mail

In popular culture
A documentary film called "Thariode"  directed by Nirmal Baby Varghese and produced by Baby Chaithanya, tells the story of gold mining in Thariode, one of the most ancient cities of Malabar Region in British India. Director Nirmal is also planning a big budget movie in that same setting.

References

Villages in Wayanad district
Kalpetta area